Samuel Paul Wiltshire (13 March 1891, Burnham-on-Sea, Somerset – 13 May 1967) was an English mycologist and phytopathologist. For the academic year 1943–1944 he was the president of the British Mycological Society.

Biography
He studied at the University of Bristol and Emmanuel College, Cambridge, where he graduated with an M.A. In 1914 he joined the staff of the Long Ashton Research Station and worked there briefly before leaving to do work related to WW I. In 1919 he returned as a mycologist employed by the Long Ashton Research Station and for a few years investigated fruit tree diseases caused by the apple and pear scab fungi. (Venturia inaequalis causes apple scab; Venturia pyrina causes pear scab.) In 1922 Edwin John Butler appointed him a staff member of the Imperial Bureau of Mycology (now called the International Mycological Institute). The Bureau's main function, which remained for decades the basic function of the Institute, was to publish a monthly abstracting journal entitled the Review of Applied Mycology. The abstracts provide coverage of the world literature on plant diseases. In 1922 Wiltshire married Violet Gertrude Scott, whose father was botanist Dukinfield Henry Scott, FRS.

From 1924 to 1939, S. P. Wiltshire was the assistant director of the Imperial Bureau of Mycology, which in 1930 became part of the Imperial Agricultural Bureaux and was renamed the Imperial Mycological Institute (IMI). From 1940 until his retirement in 1956 he was the director of the IMI, which in 1948 had its name changed from the Imperial Mycological Institute to the  Commonwealth Mycological Institute.

Wiltshire gave the British Mycological Association's 1944 presidential address entitled The organization of the study of systematic mycology. As director, he initiated Mycological Papers, Phytopathological Papers, and the regular publication of the geographical distribution of plant diseases as shown on maps. He also initiated a second abstracting journal, the Review of Medical and Veterinary Mycology, the Index of Fungi (listing new names proposed for genera and species of fungi), and an annual (later semiannual) Bibliography of Systematic Mycology. His 1933 paper on Alternaria and his 1938 paper on Stemphylium are noteworthy.

Selected publications

Articles
 
 
 
  abstract
 
 
  abstract
  abstract
 
  abstract
  abstract
  abstract
  15 pages abstract

References

1891 births
1967 deaths
Alumni of Emmanuel College, Cambridge
British mycologists
British phytopathologists